Chris or Christopher Elder may refer to:

Chris Elder (rugby union), English rugby player 
Christopher Elder, diplomat from New Zealand

See also
Christopher Alder, British paratrooper
Christian Elder, NASCAR driver